Gavin Timothy Griffiths (born 19 November 1993) is an English cricketer who most recently played for Lancashire County Cricket Club. He is a right-arm fast-medium bowler, who also bats right-handed. He made his one-day debut for Lancashire against Northamptonshire in August 2014.

He made his first-class debut on 28 March 2017 for Leicestershire against Loughborough MCCU as part of the Marylebone Cricket Club University fixtures.

References

External links
 

1993 births
Living people
English cricketers
People from Ormskirk
Lancashire cricketers
Hampshire cricketers
Leicestershire cricketers